Marcel Bossi (born 14 January 1960) is a retired Luxembourgian football defender.

References

1960 births
Living people
Luxembourgian footballers
FC Progrès Niederkorn players
Jeunesse Esch players
Association football defenders
Luxembourg international footballers